Assembly theory is a theory that characterizes object complexity. When applied to molecule complexity, its authors claim it to be the first technique that is experimentally verifiable, unlike other molecular complexity algorithms that lack experimental measure. The theory was developed as a means to detect evidence of extraterrestrial life from data gathered by astronomical observations or probes.

Background 
The theory was invented by Leroy Cronin and developed by the team he leads at the University of Glasgow, then extended in collaboration with a team at Arizona State University led by Sara Imari Walker. It is difficult to identify chemical signatures that are unique to life. For example, the Viking lander biological experiments detected molecules that could be explained by either living or natural non-living processes.

Assembly theory outputs how complex a given object is as a function of the number of independent parts and their abundances. To calculate how complex an item is, it is recursively divided into its component parts. The 'assembly index' is defined as the shortest path to put the object back together.

For example, the word 'abracadabra' consists of 5 different letters and is 11 symbols long. It can be assembled from its constituents as a + b --> ab + r --> abr + a --> abra + c --> abrac + a --> abraca + d --> abracad + abra --> abracadabra, because 'abra' was already constructed at an earlier stage. Because this requires 7 steps, the assembly index is 7. The string ‘abcdefghijk’ has no repeats so has an assembly index of 10.

While other approaches can provide a measure of complexity, the researchers claim that assembly theory's molecular assembly number is the first to be measurable experimentally. They argue that the molecular assembly number can be used to gauge the improbability that a complex molecule was created without life, with a higher number of steps corresponding to a higher improbability. This method could be implemented in a fragmentation tandem mass spectrometry instrument to search for biosignatures. Leroy Cronin stated "Our system is the first falsifiable hypothesis for life detection and is based on the idea that only living systems can produce complex molecules that could not form randomly in any abundance, and this allows us to sidestep the problem of defining life."

The theory was extended to map chemical space with molecular assembly trees. These trees were formed by arranging constituent pieces in size order. When two or more molecules have common units, their trees are combined, including the two target molecules and various hybrids.

See also 
 List of interstellar and circumstellar molecules
 Word problem for groups

References

Further reading

External links 
 Finding Life by Looking for Complexity: Interview with Leroy Cronin about assembly theory on Planetary Radio broadcast, 30 June 2021.
 Lee Cronin: Origin of Life, Aliens, Complexity, and Consciousness: Interview with Leroy Cronin in which assembly theory is discussed (starting at 1:27:23) on the Lex Fridman Podcast.

Extraterrestrial life
Molecular biology techniques